Jürgen Seyfarth is a German rower, who competed for the SG Dynamo Potsdam / Sportvereinigung (SV) Dynamo. He won the medals at international rowing competitions.

References 

Living people
Year of birth missing (living people)
East German male rowers
World Rowing Championships medalists for East Germany